Archduke Otto Franz Joseph Karl Ludwig Maria of Austria (21 April 1865 – 1 November 1906) was the second son of Archduke Karl Ludwig of Austria (younger brother of Emperor Franz Joseph I of Austria) and his second wife, Princess Maria Annunciata of Bourbon-Two Sicilies. He was the father of Charles I of Austria, the final Emperor of Austria.

Biography

Heirs presumptive 
Otto was a son of Archduke Karl Ludwig of Austria and his wife, Princess Maria Annunciata of Bourbon-Two Sicilies.  Otto's father, Karl Ludwig, was a younger brother of Emperor Franz Joseph I of Austria; and Karl Ludwig became heir presumptive to the Austro-Hungarian throne when his cousin Crown Prince Rudolf committed suicide in 1889. Although a newspaper account claimed that Karl Ludwig renounced his rights to the throne that same year (1889) in favour of his eldest son, Franz Ferdinand, that story is not certain.

On the death of Karl Ludwig in May 1896, Otto's brother Franz Ferdinand did indeed become heir presumptive to the Austro-Hungarian throne. At the time of their father's death, Franz Ferdinand had been ill with tuberculosis and there was speculation that Franz Ferdinand would renounce his rights, which would have made his brother, Otto, heir presumptive.  However, this did not happen, and Otto was never first in line to the throne.

In 1914, Franz Ferdinand was assassinated by the Serbian nationalist terrorist Gavrilo Princip in Sarajevo, and Otto's son Charles became heir presumptive. Charles inherited the throne two years later.

Youth 
Otto's mother died when he was six years old.  Otto and his elder brother Franz Ferdinand were taught by Alfred Ludwig, Baron of Degenfeld.  Otto was not interested in learning and often played pranks on his teachers.  Nevertheless, his teachers preferred the cheerful Otto more than his grumpy and irascible older brother.  He was also his father's favourite, which led to a challenging relationship with his brother.

Otto had a reputation as a loafer and was often involved in scandals. In one instance, he was known to have jumped nude from a private dining room in the Hotel Sacher in front of a visiting British peeress. He is also widely remembered for the widely circulated story that he had been spotted in a hallway at the same hotel, about to enter a lady's room, wearing nothing else but a sword. He was gradually alienated from the imperial court, and eventually even his wife distanced herself from him.

Death
Around 1900, he contracted syphilis. This caused him agonizing pain for the last two years of his life.  He withdrew from public life and spent a year in Egypt, where he found temporary reprieve.  He returned to Austria, where he fell ill again.  The last few months of his life, he lived in a villa in the Viennese suburb Währing.  He was forced to replace his nose with a rubber prosthetic due to facial deformity. He was seriously ill, and was nursed by his last mistress, Louise Robinson, using the pseudonym Sister Martha, and by his stepmother Infanta Maria Theresa of Portugal.  He died on 1 November 1906, in the presence of his spiritual adviser, Godfried Marschall (de), the auxiliary bishop of Vienna.

Succession 
After their father's death, Otto's elder brother Franz Ferdinand automatically became heir-presumptive to the throne under the Habsburg house laws.  There was no need for a special declaration to make him heir presumptive.  However, it did not escape the public's attention that the Emperor never commented on his new heir-presumptive.  Franz Ferdinand suffered from some serious medical problems, and there were concerns that his health might never allow him to fulfill his role as emperor.

In 1896 it was brought to Franz Ferdinand's attention that Count Gołuchowski, the Foreign Minister, had suggested that the emperor, considering Franz Ferdinand's lung disease, might reconsider the line of succession.  This led to speculations that Otto might inherit the throne.  It was noticed that Otto had more personnel than was usual for an archduke and that he carried out representative tasks that would normally be done by the heir presumptive.  Despite his life style, Otto was more popular among the courtiers than his elder brother.  Franz Ferdinand was outraged by these speculations and by the fact that he had received the modest Modena Palace as his residence and Otto the larger Augarten Palace.  Franz Ferdinand felt snubbed, although Otto assured him he had no ambitions for the throne.

Marriage and issue

Under pressure from the imperial court, he married Princess Maria Josepha of Saxony, daughter of King Georg of Saxony on October 2, 1886.  The court in Vienna urgently needed such a wedding to repair their relationship with the Saxon royal family, after both Crown Prince Crown Prince Rudolf of Austria and Otto's brother Franz Ferdinand had snubbed the Saxons by rejecting Maria's elder sister Mathilde.

Otto and Maria had two sons: 
 Charles I of Austria married Princess Zita of Bourbon-Parma and had issue.
 Archduke Maximilian Eugen of Austria married Princess Franziska von Hohenlohe-Waldenburg-Schillingsfürst and had issue.

Their marriage was unhappy, and the Archduke was often unfaithful. He had illegitimate children including two by his mistress, Marie Schleinzer:
 Alfred Joseph von Hortenau, father of the actress Isabel del Puerto 
 Hildegard von Hortenau

Honours 
The mountain lodge Erzherzog-Otto-Schutzhaus on the Rax plateau in Lower Austria, is named after him.

Decorations and awards

Ancestry

Footnotes 

House of Habsburg-Lorraine
1865 births
1906 deaths
Deaths from syphilis
Austrian princes
Burials at the Imperial Crypt
Knights of the Golden Fleece of Austria
Grand Crosses of the Order of Saint Stephen of Hungary
Knights of Malta
Grand Crosses of the Order of the Star of Romania
Recipients of the Order of St. Anna, 1st class
Recipients of the Order of the White Eagle (Russia)